The Ludza dialect or Lutsi is a dialect of South Estonian that was spoken in Latvia by the Ludza Estonians near the town of Ludza in Latvia. Ludza is the most similar to the Seto dialect of South Estonian. The Ludza dialect has been on a decline and is now extinct. It was estimated that around 800 people spoke Ludza in the year 1894, and in 1936 this number had decreased to only around 30-40 people. The last native speaker of Ludza dialect was Nikolājs Nikonovs, who was from the village of Lielie Tjapši. He died in the year 2006 but some people still have small knowledge of the dialect. The last knowledgeable passive speaker Antonīna Nikonova, died later in 2014.

History 
The origin of the Ludza people is a mystery, and there are many theories about it. Lutsis themselves had many stories about their origins, one of the stories is about fleeing from Sweden. In 1893 Oskar Kallas found Ludzi speakers in 53 villages around Mērdzene, Pilda, Nirza and Brigi. There were attempts to get Ludza be taught in schools, and creating a standard written form. However these efforts were stopped by Ulmanis. And Voolaine, who was the one to attempt creating Ludza education was banned from entering Latvia. During the Soviet occupation, Voolaine visited the Lutsis again. Lutsi dialect persisted the longest in Lielie Tjapši.

Current situation 
The Ludza people are still mostly aware of their heritage and some can make sentences in Ludza and know a few words. The Ludza people have in recent times connected with Livonians and in 2019 a Ludza song was performed at a Livonian culture event. In the year 2020 a book was published for studying the Ludza dialect called "" by Uldis Balodis. Lutsis who live in the area around Mērdzene generally have no knowledge of the Ludza dialect but areas south of the town of Ludza near Pilda have more knowledge of the language.

Example of words in Ludza 

  = bread
  = butter
  = cat
  = dog
  = hen
  = house
  = pig
  = hand/arm
  = hat
  = head
  = leg/foot
  = girl
  = friend

Examples of Ludza 
 = The king sent the army to look for the boy

 = From where did you get those fish?

 = Still the mother is sending the son to war.

 = Come up the mountain

 = Give it to me to taste, too

 = The priest doesn't sleep until twelve o'clock

Phonology

Consonants

References

External links 
 Lutsimaa

Estonian dialects
South Estonian language
Finnic languages
Vowel-harmony languages
Languages of Latvia
Extinct languages of Europe